Bruno Beudet (born 26 September 1964) is a French wrestler. He competed in the men's freestyle 74 kg at the 1988 Summer Olympics.

References

External links
 

1964 births
Living people
French male sport wrestlers
Olympic wrestlers of France
Wrestlers at the 1988 Summer Olympics
Sportspeople from Côte-d'Or